Peter John Noonan (November 24, 1881 – February 11, 1965) was an American professional baseball infielder. He played in Major League Baseball (MLB) for the Philadelphia Athletics (1904), Chicago Cubs (1906), and St. Louis Cardinals (1906-1907).

References

External links

1881 births
1965 deaths
People from West Stockbridge, Massachusetts
Major League Baseball infielders
Philadelphia Athletics players
Chicago Cubs players
St. Louis Cardinals players
Baseball players from Massachusetts
Minor league baseball managers
St. Paul Saints (AA) players
Auburn (minor league baseball) players
Wilkes-Barre Barons (baseball) players
Scranton Miners players
Troy Trojans (minor league) players